Illiers-Combray is a commune in the Eure-et-Loir department in north central France.

Population

Literature
Combray was the writer Marcel Proust's name for the village of Illiers (near the Cathedral town of Chartres), vividly depicted by him in the opening chapters of his vast semi-autobiographical novel In Search of Lost Time.

The home of Proust's "Aunt Léonie" in the heart of the village, where he spent much of his childhood, has been transformed into a museum to the writer's memory. It provides visitors with a delightful view of 19th-century provincial life as well as of the many Proustian mementos on display.

It should be added that Proust scholars have recently claimed his descriptions of "Combray" owe as much to the author's stays in his uncle's home in Auteuil, near Paris, as to Illiers-Combray.

As a tribute to Proust's literary masterpiece, the people of Illiers decided, in 1971, to change the town's name to Illiers-Combray, on the occasion of the centenary of the author's birth.

Twinning
The village is twinned with Coniston, Cumbria, the home of John Ruskin. Ruskin's work was a source of inspiration to Proust.

See also
Communes of the Eure-et-Loir department

References

Communes of Eure-et-Loir
In Search of Lost Time
Orléanais